Heinz Nittel (1931–1981), a leader of the Austrian Socialist party and the president of the Austrian-Israeli Friendship League, was shot to death on 1 May 1981 outside his home in Vienna  by Hesham Mohammed Rajeh, 21,  born in Iraq.      Rajeh was also indicted for the 1981 Vienna synagogue attack.

References

Terrorist incidents in Europe in 1981
Terrorist attacks attributed to Palestinian militant groups
Palestinian terrorist incidents in Europe
1931 births
1981 deaths
Austrian socialists
Austrian politicians
Austrian murder victims
People murdered in Austria
Deaths by firearm in Austria
1981 murders in Austria
Terrorist incidents in Austria